On May 13, 2015, a fire broke out at the Kentex Manufacturing factory in Valenzuela, Metro Manila, Philippines.  Seventy-four people were killed in the fire, making the incident the third worst fire incident in Philippine history; after the Ozone Disco Club fire in 1996 and the Manor Hotel fire in Quezon City in 2001, which killed 162 and 75 people respectively.

Fire 
Kentex is a small manufacturer of flip flops and other rubber shoes located in Valenzuela City, a northern suburb of Manila, Philippines.  It is one of many similar businesses serving the local market in a poor area of town.

On May 13, 2015, a fire broke out when welding sparks ignited chemicals stored near the entrance of the Kentex Manufacturing factory.  It is possible, although unconfirmed, that welding works was being carried out on the doors of one of the main entrances to the building. Thick, black smoke engulfed the building as rubber and chemicals burned.  The fire spread quickly and few people escaped.  Unable to leave, trapped workers retreated to the second floor and attempted to call relatives for help.

It took five hours for the fire department to get the blaze under control. The fire left the building unstable, causing a delay in the retrieval of the dead while engineers secured the building.

Aftermath

At least 72 people were killed in the fire.  Most of the victims likely suffocated from smoke inhalation.  Many bodies were badly burnt, being "reduced to skulls and 
bones" in some cases.  Seventy-three of the 74 bodies were found on the factory's second floor.  The Barangay Maysan village hall was converted into a temporary morgue to store the dead.

On May 14, Valenzuela City fire chief Mel Jose Lagan and senior inspector Ed-Groover Oculam were placed on administrative leave as authorities investigated possible wrongdoing.  Before the announcement, Lagan was adamant that local firefighters had not been negligent.  He said that the arson unit would look into how the workers became trapped, saying that there were sufficient exits to the building.

Survivors of the blaze claimed that the factory had sweatshop-like conditions and blamed the large loss of life on barred windows. The workers worked for "well below minimum wage" and endured foul smells, according to family of the victims and The Trade Union Congress of the Philippines. Pay was dependent on the number of shoes produced, creating wages as little as 300 pesos (US$6.70) in a 12-hour day (minimum wage is 481 pesos). Other survivors said that the company was not making required social security and health insurance payments. A survivor who escaped from the first floor remarked, "They were screaming for help, holding onto the bars. When we could no longer see their hands, we knew they had died ... they died because they were trapped on the second floor."  Another survivor remarked, "We were running not knowing exactly where to go ... if people had known what to do, it would have been different."

Acting national police chief Leonardo Espina said, "Someone will definitely be charged because of the deaths," adding that it was only a matter of determining who was negligent in the case. Interior Secretary Mar Roxas promised justice for the victims, and said that he was angered by the apparent cause (welding near flammable materials) and insufficient exits in the factory.  The factory's workers had apparently received no safety training.  Initial investigations indicated that the factory had no sprinklers and the building was overcrowded during work hours.  Additionally, a substantial portion of the work force had been recruited by an illegal sub-contractor.

A September 2014 government assessment found Kentex in compliance with safety requirements. According to the Department of Labor and Employment, the company had an established safety committee.

On 17 May, the welder whose activity caused the fire sought police protection, claiming that he was receiving death threats.  The welder said that he had been working on the factory's roll-up door where deliveries are normally received, including flammable chemicals.  The chemicals are stored near the delivery point, and thus were ignited by a stray spark from the welding.  A statement from Labor and Employment Secretary Rosalinda Baldoz the same day said that charges were likely to be filed against Kentex's owners the next week.  Roxas said that the inspectors who signed off on the factory's fire safety previously would also face a probe.

In early March 2016, the Office of the Ombudsman ordered the dismissal of Valenzuela City Mayor Rex Gatchalian and six other city and fire officials for grave misconduct and gross neglect of duty in connection with the factory fire. The ombudsman said that Gatchalian, Padayao, Carreon, and Avendan were liable for issuing business permits to Kentex Manufacturing Corp. in 2015 despite its delinquent status. On his part, Gatchalian has already secured a temporary restraining order (TRO) from the Court of Appeals against the dismissal order by the Ombudsman. He also said that, if the order will be implemented, it will have a chilling effect on mayors from the highly urbanized cities who issue provisional business permits to establishments.

Former site
As of 2019, the former site of Kentex Manufacturing Company Building still stands but remains unused and currently derelict following the disaster.

In popular culture
The 2022 film Nocebo loosely bases its subplot on the fire incident. The end credits contain the statement "JUSTICE FOR ALL KENTEX FIRE VICTIMS" after mentioning the credits for its ending track Pugon by The General Strike, which also references the said fire.

See also

List of fires
Ozone Disco Club fire – worst fire in the Philippines, happened in 1996

References

2015 fires in Asia
2015 disasters in the Philippines
Fires in the Philippines
Industrial fires
Valenzuela, Metro Manila
History of Metro Manila
May 2015 events in the Philippines
Factory fires